Give Me a Chance may refer to:

Give Me a Chance, a 1993 album by Solid

Songs
"Give Me a Chance" (Lay song), 2018
"Give Me a Chance", by Amanda Falk
"Give Me a Chance", by Black Tide from Light from Above
"Give Me a Chance", by Bobby Valentino from Bobby Valentino
"Give Me a Chance", by Brigitte Nielsen from I'm the One... Nobody Else
"Give Me a Chance", by Danny! from Charm
"Give Me a Chance", by Danny Diablo from International Hardcore Superstar
"Give Me a Chance", by Domenic Troiano from Fret Fever
"Give Me a Chance", by Dwele from W.ants W.orld W.omen
"Give Me a Chance", by Jed Madela
"Give Me a Chance", by John Spencer Blues Explosion from Acme
"Give Me a Chance", by Los Bravos from Black Is Black
"Give Me a Chance", by Meghan Trainor
"Give Me a Chance", by Ngaire Fuata from Ngaire
"Give Me a Chance", by Pablo Ruiz from Jamás
"Give Me a Chance", by Paul Carrack from One Good Reason
"Give Me a Chance", by Ric Segreto
"Give Me a Chance", by Sharon Jones and the Dap-Kings from Dap Dippin' with Sharon Jones and the Dap-Kings
"Give Me a Chance", by Supertramp from Some Things Never Change

See also
"Donne-moi une chance" (French for "give me a chance"), a song by Modern Times, Luxembourg's entry in Eurovision 1993